Ghulam Ur Rehman (Urdu: مفتی غلام الرحمن) is a Pakistani religious scholar. He is the founder and the first principal of Jamia Usmania Peshawar, a position he has held since 1992. He has served as the Chairman of the Nifaz-i-Sharia Council (NSC) from 2002 to 2007 and chairman of Higher Education Commission Khyber Pakhtunkhwa.

Education and career
Ghulam Ur Rehman got his Master's degree in Islamiat and Arabic from the University of Peshawar, M.Phil Degree from Allama Iqbal Open University, and also attended some courses in Al-Azhar University. He taught at Wifaq ul Madaris and Darul Uloom Haqqania. He also served as a member of the National Academic Council of Institute of Policy Studies and as a member of Shariah Supervisory Board of the Bank of Khyber.

References

Year of birth missing (living people)
Living people
University of Peshawar alumni
Allama Iqbal Open University alumni
Al-Azhar University alumni
Pakistani academic administrators
Pakistani Islamic religious leaders
Pakistani Sunni Muslim scholars of Islam
Muslim missionaries
People from Mansehra District
People from Peshawar